Jala Jala Boogaloo Volume II is an album released by the salsa music duet Richie Ray & Bobby Cruz. Released in 1968, the album continues with the sound of its predecessor Jala Jala y Boogaloo, influenced by Latin rhythms such as the Puerto Rican Jala Jala, as well as by soul and Beat music.

Backed by the hit song "Mr. Trumpet Man", the album was an international success, being popular in the United States, Colombia, Puerto Rico and other countries. The album's success enabled the duet to sign a contract with West Side Latino records, and leave Alegre Records.

Background
With their previous albums, Richie Ray & Bobby Cruz had established themselves as prominent artists in the New York music scene of the 1960s. Releasing Jala Jala y Boogaloo in 1967, the group achieved international success with hit songs such as Richie's Jala Jala. Following the success of that album, the group returned to the studio with producer Pancho Cristal to continue with their success.

Track listing

Credits

Ricardo Ray- Piano
Bobby Cruz- Vocals
Pedro Chaparro- Trumpet
Adolphus Doc Cheatham- Trumpet
Russell S. Farnsworth- Bass guitar
Cándido Rodríguez- Timbales
Harry Rodríguez- Bongos
Joaquín Dillonis- Congas

References

1968 albums
Richie Ray & Bobby Cruz albums
Spanish-language albums